James Prince Lee (28 July 1804 – 24 December 1869) was an English clergyman and schoolmaster who became head master of King Edward's School, Birmingham, and was later the first Bishop of Manchester.

Early life
Born in London, Lee was educated at St Paul's School, London, and Trinity College, Cambridge, where he displayed exceptional ability as a classical scholar, graduating with a bachelor of arts degree in 1828; this was promoted by seniority to master of arts in 1831 and in 1861 he was awarded the degree of doctor of divinity. He married Susannah, elder daughter of George Penrice, of Elmbridge, Worcestershire, on 25 December 1830, and they had two daughters.

Teaching career
After his ordination into the Church of England priesthood in 1830, Lee served as an assistant schoolmaster at Rugby School under Thomas Arnold, who thought highly of him. In 1837, he became rector of Ayot St Peter, Hertfordshire, and in 1838 headmaster of King Edward's School, Birmingham, where he had among his pupils Edward Burne-Jones, Richard Watson Dixon, Edward White Benson, Joseph Barber Lightfoot, and Brooke Foss Westcott. There is also a house of the school named after him. In 1847 he was appointed as an honorary canon of Worcester Cathedral.

Episcopal career
On 23 October 1847, Lee was nominated as the first bishop of the newly constituted Anglican Diocese of Manchester by Queen Victoria, on the advice of the prime minister of the day, Lord John Russell. His election took place on 17 November 1847, followed by consecration on 23 January 1848, and enthronement at Manchester Cathedral on 11 February 1848.

Lee's schoolmasterly manner was an irritation to his clergy. However, he carried out great work in church extension. During his twenty-one years' tenure of the see, he consecrated 130 churches. He was elected a Fellow of the Royal Society in 1849. He took a foremost part in founding the Manchester free library in 1852, and bequeathed his own valuable collection of books to Owens College.

He died at his home, Mauldeth Hall, Stockport, in 1869, and was buried in Heaton Mersey churchyard. His memorial sermon was preached by the Rev. Edward Benson (afterwards archbishop of Canterbury) and was published with biographical details by J. F. Wickenden and others.

References

Bibliography

 
 
Attribution

Further reading

Owens College (1870) A Catalogue of the MSS. and Printed Books, bequeathed to Owens College, Manchester by the late Right Rev. James Prince Lee. (Manchester, [1870]).

External links

Bibliographic directory from Project Canterbury

1804 births
1869 deaths
People educated at St Paul's School, London
Alumni of Trinity College, Cambridge
Bishops of Manchester
Chief Masters of King Edward's School, Birmingham
Doctors of Divinity
Fellows of the Royal Society
People from Stockport
Manchester Literary and Philosophical Society